Judith K. Moriarty (born February 2, 1942) is an American politician from Missouri, first with the Democratic Party, switching to the Libertarian Party in 2005. She was the first woman to serve as Missouri Secretary of State.

Early life
Moriarty was born Judith Spry in Fairfield, Missouri, the daughter of Earl and Blanch Spry.  She graduated from high school in Warsaw, Missouri, and attended Central Missouri State University in Warrensburg.

Moriarty settled in Sedalia, Missouri, and became active in state and local politics.  She was appointed to run the local license fee office by Governor Joe Teasdale in 1977.  In 1982, Moriarty was elected county clerk of Pettis County.  She was re-elected in 1986 and 1990.

Secretary of state
In 1992, Moriarty was elected as Missouri's secretary of state.  She was sworn into office January 11, 1993, becoming the first woman to hold that position. She caused a stir early in her term when she announced that the Official Manual State of Missouri, published by the secretary of state and often referred to as the "Blue Book" because of its traditional blue cover, would instead be published with a mauve cover as a tribute to the role of women in Missouri politics.

Impeachment
In 1994, Moriarty was accused of using her position as secretary of state to help her son file for political office after the deadline had passed by back-dating a form issued by her office. Moriarty was impeached by the Missouri House of Representatives and was removed from office after an impeachment trial before the Missouri Supreme Court. Governor Mel Carnahan appointed Bekki Cook as Moriarty's successor.

In 2002, Moriarty attempted a political comeback. She ran for the Missouri House of Representatives seat representing the Sedalia area but was defeated in the November election.

In 2005, she left the Democratic Party and aligned with the Libertarian Party. Moriarty reportedly considered running for governor in 2008, but did not meet the filing deadline.

References

1942 births
Living people
Missouri Democrats
People from Sedalia, Missouri
People from Benton County, Missouri
Secretaries of State of Missouri
Women in Missouri politics
Impeached United States officials removed from office by state or territorial governments
Missouri Libertarians
University of Central Missouri alumni
Candidates in the 2002 United States elections
21st-century American politicians
Missouri politicians convicted of crimes
21st-century American women politicians